Petemathis is a genus of Caribbean jumping spiders that was first described by Jerzy Prószyński & Christa Laetitia Deeleman-Reinhold in 2012.

Species
 it contains five species, found only in Cuba and on the Greater Antilles:
Petemathis luteopunctata (Petrunkevitch, 1930) – Puerto Rico
Petemathis minuta (Petrunkevitch, 1930) – Puerto Rico
Petemathis portoricensis (Petrunkevitch, 1930) (type) – Puerto Rico
Petemathis tetuani (Petrunkevitch, 1930) – Puerto Rico
Petemathis unispina (Franganillo, 1930) – Cuba

References

Salticidae genera
Salticidae
Spiders of the Caribbean